This page details New Zealand men's national football team records and statistics; the most capped players, the players with the most goals and New Zealand's match record by opponent.

Individual records

Manager records

Team records

 Biggest victory

 Heaviest defeat

 Biggest away victory

 Biggest away defeat

 Biggest victory at the World Cup finals
 None

 Heaviest defeat at the World Cup finals

 Biggest victory at the OFC Nations Cup finals

 First defeat to a non-Oceania team

 Most consecutive victories
 7, 31 August 1958 vs.  – 4 June 1962 vs. 
 7, 1 October 1978 vs.  – 8 October 1979 vs. 

 Most consecutive matches without defeat
 11, 25 April 1981 vs.  – 7 September 1981 vs. 

 Most consecutive matches without victory
 16, 23 July 1927 – 19 September 1951

 Most consecutive defeats
 16, 23 July 1927 – 19 September 1951

 Most consecutive draws
 4, 15 June 2010 – 9 October 2010

 Most consecutive matches without scoring
 5, 28 June 1997 – 7 February 1998

 Most consecutive matches without conceding a goal
 10, Achieved on two occasions, most recently 3 May 1981 – 7 September 1981

Best / Worst Results

Best

Worst

Competition records

FIFA World Cup

OFC Nations Cup

FIFA Confederations Cup

Head-to-head record 
The list shown below shows the national football team of New Zealand's all-time international record against opposing nations. The stats are composed of FIFA World Cup, FIFA Confederations Cup and, OFC Nations Cup, as well as numerous international friendly tournaments and matches.

The following tables show New Zealand's all-time international record, correct as of 25 September 2022 vs. Australia.

AFC

CAF

CONCACAF

CONMEBOL

OFC

UEFA

Full Confederation record

References

New Zealand national football team
National association football team records and statistics